The Animals on Tour is the second American studio album by British rock band The Animals. It was released by MGM Records in February 1965 (see 1965 in music). The album included two previously released singles, "I'm Crying" and "Boom Boom" and is mostly made up of leftovers from the British The Animals album (not included on the American version) and unreleased tracks intended for the British version of Animal Tracks.

The album was available in both mono and stereo formats. The songs on the stereo release were all rechanneled, which means that the original songs were mixed in mono and were re-mixed to simulate stereo. Rechanneling often occurred on American releases by British artists.

Despite what the title indicates, The Animals on Tour is not a live album; it is entirely made up of studio recordings. The album reached #99 on the Billboard 200.

Track listing

Personnel 
The Animals
Eric Burdon – vocals
Alan Price – keyboards
Hilton Valentine – guitar
Chas Chandler – bass
John Steel – drums
Technical
Val Valentin - engineer

References 

1965 albums
The Animals albums
Albums produced by Mickie Most
MGM Records albums